Tim Parravicini (born 25 April 1981) is a retired Australian long jumper.

He finished fifth at the 2000 World Junior Championships, ninth at the 2002 Commonwealth Games, eighth at the 2002 World Cup, seventh at the 2006 Commonwealth Games and eighth at the 2007 Summer Universiade.

He became Australian champion in 2002 and 2007. His personal best jump was 8.18 metres, achieved in February 2005 in Canberra. He retired after the 2008 season.

References

External links
 

1981 births
Living people
Australian male long jumpers
Competitors at the 2002 Commonwealth Games
Competitors at the 2006 Commonwealth Games
Commonwealth Games competitors for Australia